Oltan Karakullukçu (born 7 July 1991) is a Turkish professional footballer who plays as a forward for Pendikspor.

Career
Karakullukçu is a youth product of Gümüşhanespor, and spent his early career in the amateur leagues of Turkey. Karakullukçu made his professional debut with BB Erzurumspor at the age of 29,  in a 2-1 Süper Lig win over MKE Ankaragücü on 13 September 2020. He scored both late goals in his debut after coming on as a sub in the 55th minute.

References

External links

1991 births
Sportspeople from Gümüşhane
Living people
Turkish footballers
Turkey youth international footballers
Association football forwards
Gümüşhanespor footballers
Boluspor footballers
Büyükşehir Belediye Erzurumspor footballers
Pendikspor footballers
Süper Lig players
TFF First League players
TFF Second League players
TFF Third League players